Punjab & Sind Bank is a central public sector bank under the ownership of Ministry of Finance, Government of India. It is headquartered in New Delhi.  the bank has 1526 branches which are widely spread across India out of which 635 branches are in the state of Punjab, and 25 zonal offices located all over India.

History

The bank was established in Amritsar on 24 June 1908 by Bhai Vir Singh, Sir Sunder Singh Majitha, and Sardar Tarlochan Singh to serve the then Sind and Punjab areas of colonial India.

On 15 April 1980 Punjab & Sind Bank was among six banks that the Government of India nationalised in the second wave of nationalisation. (The first wave had been in 1969 when the government nationalised the top 14 banks.)

In the 1960s Punjab & Sind Bank established a branch in London. In 1991 Bank of Baroda acquired Punjab & Sind Bank's London branch at the behest of the Reserve Bank of India following Punjab & Sind's involvement in the Sethia fraud in 1987.

Since 2004, the bank has shown growth of over 40% year on year, and its IPO was oversubscribed by more than 50 times.

On 16 July 2019, Punjab & Sind Bank disclosed that it detected a fraud, worth  by the Bhushan Power & Steel Limited.

Products

 Aadhaar Pay
 ATM
 BharatQR
 BHIM 
 Debit card
 Internet Banking
 Mobile Banking
 POS Machine
 SMS Banking 
 UPI

Financial performance

In FY 2019-20 Punjab & Sind Bank recorded a Net Loss of Rs.990.80 crore.

 Total business of the bank stood at Rs. 1,52,231.75 crore. 
 The operating profit for the year ending 2019-20 is Rs. 1097 crores.
 Gross NPA is 14.18% for the year ending 2019-20 amounting to Rs 8875 crores.
 Net NPA is 8.03% for the year ending 2019-20 amounting to Rs 4684 crores.
 Provision Coverage Ratio as on 31 March 2020 stood at 66.74%.
 The Net Worth of the bank stood at Rs. 2917 crore as on 31.03.2020.
 Total Income of the bank during the year stood at Rs 8827 crore.

The Capital Adequacy Ratio (Basel III) of the Bank is 12.76% as on 31.03.2020.

See also

 Banking in India
 List of banks in India
 List of companies of India
 Punjab National Bank
 Reserve Bank of India
 Indian Financial System Code
 List of largest banks

References

External links
 

Public Sector Banks in India
Banks established in 1908
Companies based in New Delhi
Indian companies established in 1908
Companies listed on the National Stock Exchange of India
Companies listed on the Bombay Stock Exchange